Kataphraktosaurus is a genus of the lizard family Gymnophthalmidae. The genus is monotypic, i.e. it has only one species, Kataphraktosaurus ungerhamiltoni. It occurs in Venezuela.

References

Gymnophthalmidae
Lizard genera
Reptiles of Venezuela